Shivajinagara (earlier Blackpally) is a locality in Bangalore, India. It was named after the 17th century Maratha king Shivaji, since he spent his childhood days there.

References

Neighbourhoods in Bangalore
Bangalore Civil and Military Station